BIANCO is the independent anti-corruption office in Madagascar.  It was founded in 2004 to implement a national anti-corruption strategy through the application of law and preventive measures against corruption, as well as education of the public.

See also 

 Independent Commission Against Corruption (New South Wales)

References

External links 
 BIANCO (official website)

Government of Madagascar
Anti-corruption agencies